Adrián Torres Lázaro (born 3 April 1998), commonly known as Lele, is a Spanish professional footballer who plays for Extremadura UD. Mainly a left winger, he can also play as an attacking midfielder.

Club career
Born in Arroyomolinos, Madrid, Lele represented CD Leganés and Getafe CF as a youth. On 10 May 2015, aged just 17, he made his senior debut with the latter's reserves by coming on as a second-half substitute and scoring the equalizer in a 2–2 Segunda División B away draw against Barakaldo CF.

On 21 August 2017, after finishing his formation, Lele signed for Tercera División side Internacional de Madrid, helping in the club's promotion campaign with five goals. On 10 July 2018, he moved back to former club Leganés and was assigned to the B-team also in the fourth division.

On 1 February 2019, Lele agreed to a contract with another reserve team, AD Alcorcón B, still in division four. On 9 July, he moved to Extremadura UD, being initially assigned to the B-team in the same category.

Lele made his professional debut on 7 July 2020, replacing José Pardo late into a 0–1 home loss against Cádiz CF in the Segunda División.

References

External links
 
 
 

1998 births
Living people
Spanish footballers
Footballers from the Community of Madrid
Association football midfielders
Association football wingers
Segunda División players
Segunda División B players
Tercera División players
Getafe CF B players
Internacional de Madrid players
CD Leganés B players
AD Alcorcón B players
Extremadura UD B players
Extremadura UD footballers